Duo Datz (Hebrew: אורנה ומשה דץ, Orna U-Moshe Datz; commonly referred in Hebrew as דץ ודצה Datz Ve-Datza) is the common English name for the duo made up of Orna and Moshe Datz.

The popular artists are best known in Europe for performing for Israel at the 1991 Eurovision Song Contest.  Their song Kan (Hebrew for Here; The English version of the song is called: Come Along) came third with 139 points, behind Sweden and France, who both scored 146 points. They had previously entered in the Kdam contest in 1987 with Kupidon (Cupid), coming fourth with 63 points.

In Israel they are known for the middle of the road type of music and their series of children's DVDs.

On 22 December 2006 the couple announced they were ending their 21-year marriage.

External links 
Official Site
Lyrics: Transliterated
Lyrics: Hebrew

Israeli musical duos
Eurovision Song Contest entrants for Israel
Eurovision Song Contest entrants of 1991
Musical groups established in 1986